Marygino is a rural locality (a village) in Nikolskoye Rural Settlement, Kaduysky District, Vologda Oblast, Russia. The population was 69 as of 2002. There are 3 streets.

Geography 
Marygino is located 54 km north of Kaduy (the district's administrative centre) by road. Velikoye is the nearest rural locality.

References 

Rural localities in Kaduysky District